Pick Me Up Off the Floor is the seventh studio album by American singer-songwriter Norah Jones. The album was released on June 12, 2020, by Blue Note Records. A departure from Jones' lounge leanings of the past, Pick Me Up Off the Floor is a primarily a jazz pop and jazz folk record, with elements of orchestral pop, blues, gospel, soul, country, funk, and hip hop.

Critical reception

Pick Me Up Off the Floor received an average score of 83 out of 100 from 10 reviews on Metacritic, indicating "universal acclaim."

Lior Phillips from Variety praised the album saying "stretching its borders from stormcloud blues to orchestral jazz pop to lithe Motown, the album is tied together by Jones’ ineffable ability to convey big emotions with simplicity."

Commercial performance
Pick Me Up Off the Floor debuted at number 87 on the US Billboard 200, with 10,100 album equivalent units, according to Rolling Stone charts. This became her first studio album to not reach the top ten.

Track listing

Personnel
 Norah Jones - vocals and piano (on all tracks), Wurlitzer electric piano and Hammond B3 organ (track 3), drums (6), celesta (11)
 Ayane Kozasa - viola (1)
 Paul Wiancko - cello, string arrangement (1)
 Brian Blade - drums (2–6, 9)
 Pete Remm - Hammond B3 (2, 3), synthesizer and electric guitar (2)
 John Patitucci - electric bass (2)
 Christopher Thomas - upright bass (3, 4, 9)
 Ruby Amanfu and Sam Ashworth - backing vocals (3, 4, 9)
 Mauro Refosco - shaker (3)
 Dan Iead - pedal steel guitar (4, 10)
 Leon Michels - tenor saxophone (5, 7)
 Dave Guy - trumpet (5, 7)
 Jesse Murphy - upright bass  (5–7)
 Nate Smith - drums (7)
 Jeff Tweedy - acoustic and electric guitar (8, 11), electric bass (8)
 Spencer Tweedy - drums (8)
 Mazz Swift - violin and backing vocals (9)
 Josh Lattanzi - electric bass  (10) 
 Dan Rieser and Josh Adams - drums (10)

Technical
 Norah Jones - production (except 8, 11)
 Jeff Tweedy - production (8, 11)
 Brandon Bost - recording at Electric Lady Studios, New York, NY (1)
 Andy Taub - recording at Brooklyn Recording, Brooklyn, New York (2, 5–7, 10)
 Patrick Dillett - recording at Reservoir Studios, New York (3, 4, 9)
 Matt Marinelli - additional recording at Rainbow Star, Brooklyn, NY (2–4, 6, 9, 10), mixing (1, 2, 4) 
 Jake Owen - additional recording at Superlegal Studios, New York (3)
 Homer Steinweiss - horns recording at Diamond Mine Studios, Columbus, OH (5, 7)
 Jamie Landry - mixing at Flux Studios, New York (3–7, 9)
 Tom Schick - recording and mixing at The Loft, Chicago, IL (8, 11)
 Mark Greenberg - engineer (8, 11)
 Samuel Wahl - musical assistant at Brooklyn Recording, Brooklyn, NY (2, 5–7, 10, 11)
 John Muller and Joey Wunsch - musical assistants (3–7, 9)
 James Yost - musical assistant (3, 4, 9)
 Greg Calbi and Steve Fallone - mastering  at Sterling Sound, Edgewater, NJ
 Frank Harkins - art direction, design
 Diane Russo - photography

Charts

Weekly charts

Year-end charts

References

2020 albums
Norah Jones albums
Blue Note Records albums
Albums recorded at Electric Lady Studios